Napoleon's tomb is the monument erected at Les Invalides in Paris to keep the mortal remains of Napoleon following their repatriation to France from Saint Helena in 1840, or , at the initiative of Louis Philippe I and his minister Adolphe Thiers. While the tomb's planning started in 1840, it was only completed two decades later and inaugurated by Napoleon III on 2 April 1861, after its promoter Louis Philippe I, architect Louis Visconti and main sculptors James Pradier and Pierre-Charles Simart had all died in the meantime.

Background

In early 1840, the government led by Adolphe Thiers appointed a twelve-member committee to decide on the location and outline of the funerary monument and select its architect. The committee was chaired by politician Charles de Rémusat and included writers and artists such as Théophile Gautier, David d'Angers and Jean-Auguste-Dominique Ingres.

In April 1840, the  organized a competition in which 81 architects participated, whose projects were exhibited in the recently completed Palais des Beaux-Arts. After a protracted process, Louis Visconti was selected as project architect in 1842 and finalized his design around mid-1843.

Design and completion

Visconti created a circular hollow, or open crypt, beneath the soaring dome of the Invalides. The crypt is accessed through a door flanked by two atlantes by Francisque Joseph Duret, with an inscription above recalling Napoleon's wish to be buried in Paris. It is surrounded by a circular gallery supported by twelve pillars adorned with victories, sculpted by James Pradier until his death in June 1852. Two additional panels, by François Jouffroy, commemorate the retour des cendres. A cella contains a partly gilded statue of Napoleon in coronation attire, also by Simart.

At its center is a massive sarcophagus which has often been described as made of red porphyry, including in the Encyclopædia Britannica as of mid-2021, but is actually a purple quartzite from a geological region known as Shoksha, near Lake Onega in Russian Karelia. The sarcophagus rests upon a base of green granite from the Vosges. That green granite block rests, in turn, upon a slab of black marble, 5.5m × 1.2m × 0.65m, quarried at Sainte-Luce and transported to Paris with great difficulty. In total the project used stone from no fewer than ten different quarries in and around France, Carrara marble and the quartzite from Russia.

The monument took years to complete, partly because of the exceptional requirements for the stone to be used. The Russian quartzite, intended as an echo of the porphyry used for late Roman imperial burials, was quarried in 1848 by Italian engineer Giovanni Bujatti upon Tsar Nicholas I's special permission, and shipped via Kronstadt and Le Havre to Paris, where it arrived on 10 January 1849. The sarcophagus was then sculpted by marbler A. Seguin using innovative steam-machinery techniques. It was almost finished by December 1853, but the final stages were delayed by the sudden death of Visconti that month and by Napoleon III's alternative project to move his uncle's resting place to the Basilica of Saint-Denis, which he eventually renounced after having commissioned plans for it from Eugène Viollet-le-Duc.

On 2 April 1861, Napoleon's remains were finally transferred into the sarcophagus from the nearby chapel of Saint-Jérôme, where they had lain since 1840. The ceremony was somewhat subdued and only the Emperor Napoleon III, Empress Eugénie, the Prince Imperial Napoléon Eugène, other related princes, government ministers and senior officials of the crown were present.

Later developments

The tombs of Napoleon's brothers were completed shortly afterwards, also in the Dome church, namely that of Jérôme Bonaparte in 1862 and that of Joseph Bonaparte in 1864.

On 15 December 1940, the coffin of Napoleon II was transported from Vienna to be placed next to his father's, following a decision made by Adolf Hitler upon advice from his ambassador to France Otto Abetz. Intended to boost support for collaboration in the French public, that initiative ended up precipitating a political crisis in Vichy and the abrupt dismissal of Pierre Laval by Philippe Pétain two days before the ceremony. On 18 December 1969, the coffin was transferred underground in the cella and covered by a marble slab.

In 2021, on the occasion of the second centenary of Napoleon's death, an installation titled Memento Marengo by French visual artist Pascal Convert was placed above the sarcophagus of Napoleon. It is a copy in synthetic materials of the skeleton of Napoleon's favorite horse Marengo, which is preserved as a war trophy (following Marengo's capture at the Battle of Waterloo) at the National Army Museum in London. The arrangement has generated controversy despite its temporary nature.

Gallery

See also
 Anıtkabir
 Bourguiba mausoleum
 Chiang Kai-shek Memorial Hall
 Ho Chi Minh Mausoleum
 Imperial Crypt
 Kumsusan Palace of the Sun
 Lenin's Mausoleum
 Mausoleum of Mao Zedong
 Mausoleum of Reza Shah
 Mausoleum of Saad Zaghloul
 Mazar-e-Quaid
 Statue of Napoleon (Rouen)
 Valley of the Fallen

Notes

Tombs in France
Napoleon
Burial sites of the House of Bonaparte